Bad Education is a 2019 American crime drama film directed by Cory Finley and written by Mike Makowsky. It is based on the 2004 New York magazine article "The Bad Superintendent" by Robert Kolker, about the true story of the largest public school embezzlement in American history. It features an ensemble cast including Hugh Jackman, Allison Janney, Geraldine Viswanathan, Alex Wolff, Rafael Casal, Stephen Spinella, Annaleigh Ashford and Ray Romano.

Set in the Long Island village of Roslyn in the early 2000s, the film tells the story of school district superintendent Dr. Frank Tassone (Jackman) who, along with assistant superintendent Pam Gluckin (Janney) stole millions of dollars from their wealthy public school district, and together attempted to cover up the embezzlement. The screenwriter, Makowsky, briefly met Tassone as a child before the scandal broke and attended Roslyn High School in the late 2000s.

Bad Education made its world premiere on September 8, 2019 at the Toronto International Film Festival and was broadcast on HBO on April 25, 2020. It was well received by film critics, with particular praise for Makowsky's screenplay, Finley's direction, and Jackman's and Janney's performances. At the 72nd Primetime Emmy Awards, the film won for Outstanding Television Movie and Jackman received a nomination for Outstanding Lead Actor in a Limited Series or Movie.

Plot

In 2002, Dr. Frank Tassone is superintendent of the Roslyn Union Free School District on Long Island. He and assistant superintendent Pam Gluckin have overseen major improvements in the district, with Roslyn High School becoming the fourth-ranked public school in the country. The school's performance stimulates the local economy, reaping rewards for school board president and real estate broker Bob Spicer. Beloved by students and parents, Frank claims to have lost his wife several years ago, and rejects advances from some of the local mothers. Attending a conference in Las Vegas, he begins an affair with his former student Kyle Contreras whom he meets at a bar.

Student reporter Rachel Bhargava is writing an article for the Roslyn school paper about a skywalk the school plans to construct, and Frank blithely encourages her to treat her article as any top journalist would. She investigates the project, to Pam's irritation, and notices irregularities in the district's finances. It is revealed that Pam has a fraudulent district expense card, which she encourages her niece Jenny, a district clerk, to use. When Pam's son uses the card to shop for thousands of dollars' worth of construction materials for her home renovation, Bob is alerted by a relative working at the store.

Bob and the school board confront Pam, realizing she has embezzled at least $250,000 in taxpayer funds. Frank persuades them to handle the matter quietly, detailing the consequences a public scandal would have on the school and community. They agree to conceal the embezzlement, forcing Pam to pay restitution and resign; the board announces her abrupt "retirement." Convincing district auditor Phil Metzger to falsify the financial records, Frank appoints him as Pam's temporary replacement. He transfers Jenny to a less visible "special utilities" role, threatening to expose her own misuse of funds when she implies blackmailing him.

Rachel continues her investigation, uncovering evidence of the embezzlement in supply orders that were never fulfilled and massive consulting fees paid to unknown companies, including Pam's husband's car dealership. She finds an annual expense of $803,000 to Wordpower Tech and visits the address, which she discovers is a Manhattan apartment. A man answers the door and Rachel leaves, but she and Frank spot each other when he arrives and enters the same apartment. The man is Tom Tuggiero, Frank's husband, and Rachel realizes Wordpower Tech is a front created by Frank, a co-conspirator in the embezzlement. Frank later warns Rachel of the potential fallout for exposing the story.

Phil informs Frank of an incriminating expense: Frank used district funds on first-class tickets to fly himself and Kyle by Concorde to London. Frank threatens to place blame squarely on Phil for failing to catch Pam's scheme and taking part in the cover-up. Phil agrees to keep quiet, but Rachel publishes her story in the school paper, exposing Frank's key role in the embezzlement. Insisting he acted in the school's best interest, Frank pleads with Bob not to confirm the scandal until the school budget is approved, but Bob and the school board report the cover-up in its entirety.

Pam, Jenny, and Phil are arrested; when the authorities threaten to prosecute her family, she agrees to testify against Frank and turns over evidence of the scheme. Tom is informed of Frank's second life with Kyle, and Rachel becomes the school paper's editor-in-chief. Frank resigns, flees to Nevada with tens of thousands of dollars in cash, and moves in with Kyle in a house he bought for him. He is eventually arrested, returned to New York, and convicted. In prison, Frank fantasizes about being back at Roslyn, where he is congratulated for making the school #1 in the country.

An epilogue reveals that Frank was convicted of embezzling $2.2 million and sentenced to 4 to 12 years in prison. Pam, who pled guilty to embezzling $4.3 million and testified against Frank, was sentenced to 3 to 9 years in prison. A total of $11 million was embezzled, the largest school theft in American history. Due to an oversight in state pension regulations, Frank is still slated to receive his teacher's pension of $173,495.04 per year.

Cast

Production
The screenplay was written by Mike Makowsky, who in 2004 was a middle school student in the Roslyn Union Free School District when its superintendent, Frank Tassone, was arrested for first-degree larceny. Makowsky bought the rights to Robert Kolker's New York article on the subject and returned to his childhood hometown to compile research for the project. He expected to write a film portraying Tassone as a straightforward villain. However, interviews with his former teachers and neighbors revealed a much more nuanced portrait of Tassone that informed the eventual screenplay. A decision was made not to involve any of the perpetrators in the development of the film, out of respect for the town of Roslyn.

Makowsky, Fred Berger, Brian Kavanaugh-Jones, Julia Lebedev, Edward Vaisman and Oren Moverman produced the film under their Automatik and Sight Unseen banners. In March 2018, Hugh Jackman entered talks to star in the film. Cory Finley (whose previous film was the Sundance darling Thoroughbreds) was announced as director at the same time.

Jackman worked with his dialect coach, Jess Platt, to perfect his accent as Tassone. Jackman noted that, "I haven't done a film without him—except for Australia, of course—for 20 years. I'm someone who can get to 80 percent of an accent sort of easily, but it's that final 20 percent that really makes a difference. He was on set with me yelling and screaming, and he's originally from Brooklyn, so he's around the area and knows it well."

In June 2018, Allison Janney joined the cast of the film, with Geraldine Viswanathan and Ray Romano signing on the following month. More than a dozen supporting cast members were hired in October 2018, including Alex Wolff, Rafael Casal, Stephen Spinella, and Annaleigh Ashford. Principal photography began in October 2018.

Historical accuracy
Rebekah Rombom was described by The New York Times in 2004 as doing "what few high school journalists ever do: she broke some real news. Her article about the embezzlement scandal in the Roslyn School District was a major scoop." The Times gave a byline to Rombom to describe the events at Roslyn High over the prior several months, and in a June 27, 2004 Times article, Tassone had only recently resigned but had not yet been charged. Rombom writes, "School officials say that are looking into payments of several hundred thousand dollars paid to a company that lists Dr. Tassone's Manhattan apartment as its address."

Her film counterpart, Rachel Bhargava, "does a little more investigative reporting than I did" according to Rombom.

The film's description of Frank Tassone living with one man in Manhattan while secretly owning another house in Las Vegas with a 32-year-old male exotic dancer appears to be accurate except possibly for one detail: in portraying the dancer as a former student. Tassone claims: "I have never, ever, in my 36-year career in education, had a relationship with a student or with someone who had graduated."

Themes
Jackman felt one of the film's main themes was the difference between the image one projects and the truth. He noted, "For Frank, how he was perceived and judged by people on-site was very important, and he justified that as being a part of his job, how he needed to project being upstanding to represent the school district in order for it to get to No. 1. [...] And by the way, it's a battle that most of us face in our everyday life. It starts off as a teenager when you're trying to get a boyfriend or girlfriend or someone to like you, and you're like, OK, I'm not going to try that part, what's going to work for me?"

Release
Bad Education had its world premiere at the Toronto International Film Festival on September 8, 2019. Shortly after, HBO Films acquired distribution rights for $17.5 million in the largest deal of the festival. It was released April 25, 2020, on the HBO premium cable network and HBO's streaming services. The film was also available at the launch of HBO Max.

Reception

Critical response

The site's critical consensus reads: "Anchored by an outstanding Hugh Jackman, Bad Education finds absurd laughs—and a worthy message—in the aftermath of a real-life scandal." On Metacritic, the film has a weighted average score of 79 out of 100, based on 29 critics, indicating "generally favorable reviews".

Peter Travers of Rolling Stone described Jackman's work as "a career-best performance from a movie star with a genuine actor's depth and range" and the script as "devilishly clever and detailed". Ben Kenigsberg of The New York Times chose the film as the publication's critic's pick and praised Finley's composition, Makowsky's dialogue, the set decoration, Abels' "jarring, percussive score", and Jackman's "darkly charismatic" performance.

David Ehrlich of IndieWire commended Makowsky's script as a "well-calculated masterclass in narrative economy". Jake Coyle of the Associated Press compared the film's tone and story favorably to Alexander Payne's 1999 film Election. Coyle also singled out Janney's performance as sliding "into the movie so perfectly that it feels more like she came first and the film was sensibly built around her".

Frank Tassone spoke admiringly about Jackman and Janney's performances. He noted that Jackman "did a very good job playing me. Especially at the end, when I walk out of prison and I see what I lost. That really hit home for me. Because I did lose all of that."

TV ratings
On its first televised airing, Bad Education scored an .18 rating in the 18–49 demographic.

Accolades

See also
2019 college admissions bribery scandal

References

External links 
 
 
 

2019 films
2019 crime drama films
2019 LGBT-related films
2010s high school films
American films based on actual events
American crime drama films
American high school films
American LGBT-related films
Crime films based on actual events
Drama films based on actual events
Films based on newspaper and magazine articles
Films scored by Michael Abels
Films set in 2002
Films set in the 2000s
Films set in Long Island
Films shot in New York (state)
Gay-related films
HBO Films films
LGBT-related drama films
LGBT-related films based on actual events
Primetime Emmy Award for Outstanding Made for Television Movie winners
2019 independent films
American drama television films
2010s English-language films
2010s American films